The Yesvantpur–Mangalore Central Weekly Express is an intercity train started by the South Western Railway zone of the Indian Railways of the Indian Railways connecting Yesvantpur in Karnataka and  of Karnataka. It is currently being operated with 16565/16566 train numbers on a weekly basis.

History 

With an increased demand for transport development between Mangalore and Bangalore. Mangalore is a fast-developing city, but the only problem was the development of proper and timely transport facility with the Karnataka state capital was absent. With the introduction of the Mangalore Yaswanthpur Express, adequate transport was developed between the two important cities.

Service

The 16565/Yesvantpur–Mangaluru Central Weekly Express has an average speed of 47 km/hr and covers 834 km in 17 hrs 45 mins. 16566/Mangaluru Central–Yesvantpur Weekly Express has an average speed of 48 km/hr and 834 km in 17 hrs 30 mins.

Route and halts 

The important halts of the train are:

Coach composite

The train has standard ICF rakes with max speed of 110 kmph. The train consists of 22 coaches:

 1 AC First-class
 3 AC II Tier
 3 AC III Tier
 10 Sleeper coaches
 4 General
 2 Second-class Luggage/parcel van

Schedule

Rake sharing

12539/40 - Yesvantpur–Lucknow Express (via Vijayawada)

External links
 http://indiarailinfo.com/train/7479

References 

Express trains in India
Rail transport in Karnataka
Rail transport in Andhra Pradesh
Rail transport in Tamil Nadu
Rail transport in Kerala
Transport in Bangalore
Transport in Mangalore
Railway services introduced in 2013